Ingrid Syrstad Engen (born 29 April 1998) is a Norwegian professional footballer who plays as a midfielder for Spanish Primera División club Barcelona and the Norway national team. She previously played for Trondheims-Orn and LSK Kvinner in Norway and Wolfsburg in Germany before joining Barcelona in 2021.

Club career
Engen began her senior career with Trondheims-Ørn. After the 2016 Toppserien she rejected approaches from other clubs to extend her contract with Trondheims-Ørn.

After moving to LSK Kvinner and helping them secure a League and Cup double, she signed for German champions VfL Wolfsburg in December 2018. As part of the deal she agreed a return to LSK on loan for the first half of the 2019 season.

On 6 July 2021, she signed a two-year deal with Barcelona, keeping her for the club until 30 June 2023. On 25 September, she made her debut for the club in a 8–0 win over Valencia.

In January 2023, Engen extended her contract with Barcelona until June 2025.

International career
Engen was included in the Norway women's team in its debut for the 2018 Algarve Cup. She won her debut cap when Australia defeated Norway in its opening match, in Albufeira, 4–3.

In September 2018, Engen was included in the national team for the 2019 FIFA Women's World Cup qualification – UEFA Group 3 that defeated Netherlands, 2–1. This win secured Norway's passage for the final tournament in France. She was praised by team coach Martin Sjögren: "She is only 20 years old but appears to have played international football for 10 years".

Style of play
Engen usually plays as a box-to-box midfielder or "number 8" position as a central midfielder closer to the right side of the pitch.

Personal life
Engen was in a relationship with fellow Norway international player Marie Dølvik Markussen. 

She is currently in a relationship with Barcelona teammate and Spanish international María Pilar León.

Career statistics

Club

International

Scores and results list Norway's goal tally first, score column indicates score after each Engen goal.

Honours

Club 
LSK Kvinner
Toppserien: 2018
Norwegian Women's Cup: 2018

VfL Wolfsburg
Frauen-Bundesliga: 2019–20
DFB-Pokal Frauen: 2019–20, 2020–21
FC Barcelona

 Primera División: 2021–22
 Supercopa de España Femenina: 2021–22

International 
Algarve Cup: 2019

References

External links

 Ingrid Syrstad Engen at FC Barcelona
 Ingrid Syrstad Engen at BDFutbol
 
 
 
 

1998 births
Living people
Norwegian women's footballers
Norway women's international footballers
Women's association football midfielders
Toppserien players
LSK Kvinner FK players
SK Trondheims-Ørn players
Norwegian expatriate women's footballers
VfL Wolfsburg (women) players
FC Barcelona Femení players
Expatriate women's footballers in Germany
Norwegian expatriate sportspeople in Germany
Norwegian expatriate sportspeople in Spain
2019 FIFA Women's World Cup players
People from Melhus
Lesbian sportswomen
LGBT association football players
Norwegian LGBT sportspeople
Sportspeople from Trøndelag
UEFA Women's Euro 2022 players
Frauen-Bundesliga players
Primera División (women) players
Expatriate women's footballers in Spain